Schistura tigrina is a species of ray-finned fish in the genus Schistura.

Footnotes 
 

T
Taxa named by Waikhom Vishwanath
Taxa named by Kongbrailatpan Nebeshwar Sharma
Fish described in 2005